Oluwatobi Fabian Shobowale Akintunde "Tobi" Sho-Silva (born 27 March 1995) is an English professional footballer who plays for Carlisle United as a forward.

Career
After playing youth football for Charlton Athletic, Sho-Silva signed on loan for Welling United in January 2014. The loan was extended a month later. In May 2014 he signed a new contract with Charlton. After returning to his parent club, he re-signed on loan for Welling United in September 2014. He moved on loan to Inverness Caledonian Thistle in September 2015. Following his release by the Addicks, Sho-Silva joined Bromley after a successful trial spell during pre-season. At the end of the season, he departed the club, having scored 11 National League goals.

In June 2017, Sho-Silva signed for Dover Athletic. On 7 December 2018, Sho-Silva signed for Chelmsford City on a one-month loan deal. In February 2019, Sho-Silva signed on loan for Margate.

Sho-Silva was released by Dover at the end of the 2018–19 season and joined FC Halifax Town. Sho-Silva joined Sutton United in August 2020 and was part of the team that won the National League and gained promotion to the Football League for the first time in the club's history.

On 31 January 2022, Sho-Silva joined League Two side Carlisle United for an undisclosed fee on an 18-month contract.

International career
Born in England, Sho-Silva is of Nigerian descent. He has represented England at under-18 level, making only one appearance in a 1–0 loss to Belgium on 5 March 2013.

Career statistics

Honours

Club
Sutton United
 National League: 2020–21

References

1995 births
Living people
Black British sportspeople
English footballers
England youth international footballers
English people of Nigerian descent
Charlton Athletic F.C. players
Welling United F.C. players
Inverness Caledonian Thistle F.C. players
Bromley F.C. players
Dover Athletic F.C. players
Chelmsford City F.C. players
Margate F.C. players
FC Halifax Town players
Sutton United F.C. players
Carlisle United F.C. players
Association football forwards
National League (English football) players
Scottish Professional Football League players
Isthmian League players
English Football League players